The Sacrifice is a 1986 drama film written and directed by Andrei Tarkovsky. Starring Erland Josephson, the film was produced by the Swedish Film Institute. Many of the crew were alumni of Ingmar Bergman's films.

The Sacrifice centers on a middle-aged intellectual who attempts to bargain with God to stop an impending nuclear holocaust. The film combines pagan and Christian religious themes; Tarkovsky called it a "parable".

The Sacrifice was Tarkovsky's third film as a Soviet expatriate, after Nostalghia and the documentary Voyage in Time, and he died shortly after its completion. He was diagnosed with cancer after making of the film, and by 1986 was unable to attend its presentation at the Cannes Film Festival due to his illness. Like 1972's Solaris, it won the Grand Prix at the Cannes Film Festival.

Plot
The film opens on the birthday of Alexander (Erland Josephson), an actor who gave up the stage to work as a journalist, critic and lecturer on aesthetics. He lives in a beautiful house with his actress wife Adelaide (Susan Fleetwood), stepdaughter Marta (Filippa Franzén), and young son, "Little Man", who is temporarily mute due to a throat operation. Alexander and Little Man plant a tree by the seaside, when Alexander's friend Otto, a part-time postman, delivers a birthday card to him. When Otto asks, Alexander says his relationship with God is "nonexistent". After Otto leaves, Adelaide and Victor, a medical doctor and a close family friend who performed Little Man's operation, arrive and offer to take Alexander and Little Man home in Victor's car, but Alexander prefers to stay behind and talk to his son. In his monologue, he first recounts how he and Adelaide found their house near the sea by accident, and how they fell in love with it and its surroundings, but then enters a bitter tirade against the state of modern man. As Tarkovsky wrote, Alexander is weary of "the pressures of change, the discord in his family, and his instinctive sense of the threat posed by the relentless march of technology"; in fact, he has "grown to hate the emptiness of human speech".

The family, Victor, and Otto gather at Alexander's house for the celebration. Their maid Maria leaves, while nurse-maid Julia stays to help with the dinner. People comment on Maria's odd behavior. The guests chat inside the house, where Otto reveals that he is a student of paranormal phenomena, a collector of "inexplicable but true incidents." Just when dinner is almost ready, the rumbling noise of low-flying jet fighters interrupts them, and soon after, as Alexander enters, a news program announces the beginning of what appears to be all-out war, and possibly nuclear holocaust. His wife has a complete nervous breakdown. In despair, Alexander vows to God to renounce all he loves, even Little Man, if this may be undone. Otto advises him to slip away and lie with Maria, who Otto tells him is a witch "in the best possible sense".

Alexander takes a pistol from Victor's medical bag, leaves a note in his room, escapes the house, and rides Otto's bike to Maria's house. He tells her the story of when he fixed up and brought order to his mother's garden, only to find that it lost all its beauty when he did so. She is bewildered when he makes his advances, but when he puts the gun to his temple ("Don't kill us, Maria"), at which point the jet fighters' rumblings return, she soothes him and they make love while floating above her bed, though Alexander's reaction is ambiguous.

When he wakes the next morning, in his own bed, everything seems normal. Nevertheless, Alexander sets forth to give up all he loves and possesses. He tricks the family members and friends into going for a walk, and sets fire to their house while they are away. As the group rushes back, alarmed by the fire, Alexander confesses that he set it, and runs around wildly. Maria, who until then was not seen that morning, appears; Alexander tries to approach her, but is restrained by others. Without explanation, an ambulance appears, and two paramedics chase Alexander, who appears to have lost control of himself, and drive off with him. Maria begins to bicycle away, but stops to observe Little Man watering the tree he and Alexander planted the day before. As Maria leaves, the "mute" Little Man, lying at the foot of the tree, speaks his only line, which quotes the opening of the Gospel of John: "In the beginning was the Word. Why is that, Papa?"

Cast
 Erland Josephson as Alexander
 Susan Fleetwood as Adelaide
 Allan Edwall as Otto
 Guðrún Gísladóttir as Maria
 Sven Wollter as Victor
 Valérie Mairesse as Julia
 Filippa Franzén as Marta
 Tommy Kjellqvist as Gossen (Little Man)
 Per Källman, Tommy Nordahl as ambulance drivers

Production

Pre-production
The Sacrifice originated as a screenplay called The Witch, which preserved the element of a middle-aged protagonist spending the night with a reputed witch. But in this story, his cancer was miraculously cured, and he ran away with the woman. In March 1982, Tarkovsky wrote in his journal that he considered this ending "weak", as the happy ending was unchallenged. He wanted personal favorite and frequent collaborator Anatoly Solonitsyn to star in this picture, as was also his intention for Nostalghia, but when Solonitsyn died from cancer in 1982, the director rewrote the screenplay into what became The Sacrifice and also filmed Nostalghia with Oleg Yankovsky as the lead.

Tarkovsky considered The Sacrifice different from his earlier films because, while his recent films had been "impressionistic in structure", in this case he not only "aimed...to develop [its] episodes in the light of my own experience and of the rules of dramatic structure", but also to "[build] the picture into a poetic whole in which all the episodes were harmoniously linked", and because of this, it "took on the form of a poetic parable".

At the 1984 Cannes Film Festival, Tarkovsky was invited to film in Sweden, as he was a longtime friend of Anna-Lena Wibom of the Swedish Film Institute. He decided to film The Sacrifice with Erland Josephson, who was best known for his work with Ingmar Bergman, and whom Tarkovsky had directed in Nostalghia. Cinematographer Sven Nykvist, a friend of Josephson and frequent collaborator with Bergman, was asked to join the production. Despite a contemporaneous offer to shoot Sydney Pollack's Out of Africa, Nykvist later said it was "not a difficult choice", and like Josephson, he became a co-producer when he invested his fees back into the film. Production designer Anna Asp, who worked on Bergman's Autumn Sonata and After the Rehearsal and had won an Academy Award for Fanny and Alexander, also joined the project, as well as Daniel Bergman, one of Ingmar's children, who worked as a camera assistant. Many critics commented on The Sacrifice in the context of Bergman's work.

Filming
While often erroneously claimed to have been shot on Fårö, The Sacrifice was actually filmed at Närsholmen on the nearby island of Gotland; the Swedish military denied Tarkovsky access to Fårö.

Alexander's house, built for the production, was to be burned for the climactic scene, in which Alexander burns it and his possessions. The shot was very difficult to achieve, and the first failed attempt was, according to Tarkovsky, the only problem during shooting. Despite Nykvist's protest, only one camera was used, and while shooting the burning house, the camera jammed and the footage was thus ruined.

The scene had to be reshot, requiring a very costly reconstruction of the house in two weeks. This time, two cameras were set up on tracks, running parallel to each other. The footage in the final version of the film is the second take, which lasts six minutes (and ends abruptly because the camera had run through an entire reel). The cast and crew broke down in tears after the take was completed.

Music
The film opens and closes with the aria "Erbarme dich, mein Gott" ("Have mercy, my God") from Johann Sebastian Bach's St Matthew Passion. The soundtrack also features shakuhachi recordings by Watazumi Doso.

Post-production
Tarkovsky and Nykvist performed significant amounts of color reduction on select scenes. According to Nykvist, almost 60% of the color was removed from them.

Reception
The film won Tarkovsky his second Grand Prix, after Solaris, his third FIPRESCI Prize at the 1986 Cannes Film Festival, and his third Palme D'Or nomination. The Sacrifice also won the Prize of the Ecumenical Jury. At the 22nd Guldbagge Awards, the film won the awards for Best Film and Best Actor (Erland Josephson). In 1988, it won the BAFTA Award for Best Foreign Language Film. The film was selected as the Swedish entry for the Best Foreign Language Film at the 59th Academy Awards, but was not accepted as a nominee.

Since its release, reviewers have responded positively to the film; the review aggregator Rotten Tomatoes reports an approval rating of 86%, based on 42 reviews with an average rating of 7.58/10. The website's critical consensus states, "Formally impressive, visually accomplished, and narratively rewarding, The Sacrifice places a fittingly solid capstone on a brilliant filmmaking career".

In 1995, the Vatican compiled a list of 45 "great films", separated into the categories of Religion, Values, and Art, to recognize the centennial of cinema. The Sacrifice was included in the first category, as was Tarkovsky's Andrei Rublev.

Critics have commented on The Sacrifice'''s religious ambiguities. Dennis Lim wrote that it is "not exactly a simple allegory of Christian atonement and self-sacrifice". Catholic film critic Steven Greydanus contrasts the film's "dialectic of Christian and pagan ideas" with Andrei Rublev, writing that, while Rublev "[rejects] the advances of an alluring pagan witch as incompatible with Christian love", The Sacrifice'' "juxtaposes" both sensibilities.

See also
 List of submissions to the 59th Academy Awards for Best Foreign Language Film
 List of Swedish submissions for the Academy Award for Best Foreign Language Film

Notes

References

External links
 
 
 DVDBeaver comparison of 5 different DVD editions of the film
 The Sacrifice at nostalghia.com

1986 films
1986 multilingual films
1980s Swedish-language films
1986 drama films
Swedish drama films
Films directed by Andrei Tarkovsky
Films set in 1985
Swedish multilingual films
French multilingual films
British multilingual films
Films set in Sweden
Best Film Guldbagge Award winners
Best Foreign Language Film BAFTA Award winners
Films about World War III
British drama films
Fiction about sacrifices
Films partially in color
Cannes Grand Prix winners
1980s British films
1980s Swedish films